The EX engine series from Subaru Industrial Power Products includes nine models total, with power ranges from 4.5 to 14 horsepower. All engines in this line are four-cycle, single-cylinder, air-cooled engines.

Technology
This line is Subaru's first to utilize chain-driven overhead cam (OHC) technology, and the first to utilize OHC technology in the industrial air-cooled small engine market. The significance of Overhead Cam technology is that it's been proven to enhance engine performance. The technology allows the intake and exhaust valves being positioned for optimum engine performance, which offers lower resistance for the air/fuel mixture flow. Overhead Cam engines also have fewer moving parts and produce less mechanical noise than competitive technologies. They also offer better cooling performance to combat overheating.

Models
With one exception, all engines in the EX line are carbureted. The 7 horsepower EX21 EFI is an electronic fuel injection engine. The engine line was first introduced with four models in 2001, and has grown to include nine models.

EX Engine Models
 EX13 – 4.5 horsepower
 EX17 – 6 horsepower
 EX21 – 7 horsepower
 EX27 – 9 horsepower
 EX30 – 9.5 horsepower
 EX35 – 12 horsepower
 EX40 – 14 horsepower
 EX21 EFI – 7 horsepower
 EX27 All Season – 9 horsepower

Applications
The engines can be used on construction equipment such as soil compactors, pressure washers, generators, water pumps, air compressors, log splitters, lawn and turf seeders and chippers/shredders. The engines have also found to work well on go-karts.

References

External links
2021 Subaru Impreza

Subaru engines